Everett is an unincorporated area in Dodge County, Nebraska, United States.

History
A post office was established at Everett in 1875, and remained in operation until it was discontinued in 1907. Everett was likely named for a pioneer settler.

References

Unincorporated communities in Dodge County, Nebraska
Unincorporated communities in Nebraska